"Feels Like Love" is a song written and recorded by American country music artist Vince Gill. It was released in May 2000 as the second single from the album Let's Make Sure We Kiss Goodbye.  The song reached number 6 on the Billboard Hot Country Singles & Tracks chart and peaked at number 13 on the Canadian RPM Country Tracks chart.

Content
The song is an anthem for anyone who has found love sweeter the second time around.

Critical reception
Deborah Evans Price, of Billboard magazine reviewed the song favorably, saying that it has a "buoyant, uplifting lyric" and goes on saying that the production "gives the sprightly melody plenty of room to breathe."

Music video
The music video was directed by Thom Oliphant and premiered in mid-2000.

Chart performance
"Feels Like Love" debuted at number 62 on the U.S. Billboard Hot Country Singles & Tracks for the week of May 20, 2000.

Year-end charts

References

2000 singles
2000 songs
Vince Gill songs
Songs written by Vince Gill
Song recordings produced by Tony Brown (record producer)
MCA Nashville Records singles